The Baluarte Bridge, officially the Baluarte Bicentennial Bridge, is a cable-stayed bridge in Mexico. It is located between the municipalities of Concordia in Sinaloa and Pueblo Nuevo in Durango, along the Durango–Mazatlán highway, Mexico 40D.

Construction of the bridge began in 2008, it was inaugurated in January 2012 and opened to traffic in late 2013. The bridge forms part of a new highway linking the Atlantic and Pacific coasts of northern Mexico and has reduced the travelling time between Durango and Mazatlán from approximately 6 to 2.5 hours.

Structure and construction

Construction on the bridge began on 21 February 2008. The work was carried out by a consortium that included Tradeco Infraestructura, IDINSA, Aceros Corey and VSL México, which was awarded the contract in May 2007 by the Mexican transport and communications ministry, the SCT, beating two other higher-priced bidders. The cost has risen significantly from the original bid of 1.28 billion pesos (US$118 million); according to an SCT official, this is due, among other things, to the number of structures involved in such a project. The work is being funded by Mexico's National Infrastructure Fund (Fonadin) and the Durango-Mazatlán Trust (Fiduma). It is planned that the cost of the bridge will be recovered by concessionary fees from the highway's operator.

The choice of a cable-stayed design was made to enable the construction to proceed outward from each of the two main pylons, thus making it unnecessary to build an expensive and time-consuming falsework.

The Baluarte Bridge construction is part of an 18 billion peso (US$1.44 billion) project to build a new highway connecting Durango with Mazatlán across some of Mexico's most rugged mountains. The cost of the bridge itself has been put at 2.18 billion pesos (US$158.7 million). It will replace a notoriously dangerous road over the mountains, which are known locally as "the Devil's Backbone". The old road was built in the 1940s in terrain so difficult that mules had to be used to bring in supplies for the construction workers. When completed, the new highway is expected to slash the travelling time between Durango and Mazatlán from eight hours to two and a half. It is intended to form part of an eventual road link between the Atlantic and Pacific coasts of Mexico. Around 2,000 vehicles are expected to use the bridge daily.

Inauguration and economic and social impact

The Baluarte Bridge was inaugurated by President Calderón on 5 January 2012. Officials from Guinness World Records were on hand at the inauguration ceremony to certify the bridge as the world's highest cable-stayed bridge. At the time it was about 86 per cent complete. It was finished in late January 2012, and went operational by 2013. Its official name as the "Bicentennial" bridge refers to the 2010 bicentenary of the Mexican declaration of independence from Spain at the start of the Mexican War of Independence in 1810. It had been hoped that the bridge would be inaugurated in the second half of 2010 as part of the bicentennial celebrations, but delays pushed the date back.

During the ceremony, Calderón hailed the bridge as a way to "unite the people of northern Mexico as never before." Officials expressed the hope that it would boost trade and tourism in the area, which is one of the most remote parts of Mexico. The region is seriously affected by poverty and lawlessness which has prompted many locals to take up illegal drug farming, smuggling and even highway robbery on the old Durango–Mazatlán road. Poor communications in the region have made it difficult to police. This bridge has deemed Mexico safe since its conception. According to a town administrator in Pueblo Nuevo municipality, the new bridge and road will help to improve security by reducing the region's isolation. Officials have also expressed hopes that it will help to promote economic development. Durango's state government plans to build a new industrial park on a  site adjoining the highway, while Sinaloa's governor anticipates a boost in the usage of Mazatlán's port from the increase in cross-country traffic. The project is reported to have created 3,500 jobs directly and a further 12,000 indirectly.

Gallery

See also 
 List of largest cable-stayed bridges
 List of highest bridges in the world

References

External links

Flickr photo gallery
Images and drawings at highestbridges.com
3D-model “Baluarte Bridge” for Google Earth
"New bridge in Mexico comes loaded with big dreams" by Nick Miroff, Washington Post 01/28/2012
 See also the YouTube VSL video of mid-construction, about four minutes (NqUAAmeZ49E).
Road Traffic backstory

Cable-stayed bridges in Mexico
Buildings and structures in Durango
Buildings and structures in Sinaloa
Road-rail bridges
Bridges completed in 2012
Transportation in Durango
Sierra Madre Occidental